Henry Johnson may refer to:

Military
 Sir Henry Johnson, 1st Baronet (1748–1835), British Army officer
 Henry Johnson (sailor) (1824–?), American Civil War sailor and 1867 Medal of Honor recipient
 Henry Johnson (Buffalo Soldier) (1850–1904), African-American Indian Wars soldier and 1890 Medal of Honor recipient
 Henry Johnson (World War I soldier) (1892–1929), African-American soldier of the United States 369th Infantry Regiment in World War I; 1918 Croix de Guerre and 2015 Medal of Honor recipient
 Henry James Johnson (1924–2008), British Army officer

Politics
 Henry Johnson (politician, died 1719) (c. 1659–1719), English Member of Parliament for Aldeburgh
 Henry Johnson (Louisiana politician) (1783–1864), fifth Governor of Louisiana
 Henry U. Johnson (1850–1939), U.S. Representative from Indiana
 Henry V. Johnson (1852–1931), mayor of Denver, Colorado
 Henry Johnson (Wisconsin Treasurer) (1854–1941), member of the Wisconsin State Assembly and the 18th State Treasurer of Wisconsin
 Henry F. Johnson (1860–1941), member of the Wisconsin State Assembly
 Henry Lincoln Johnson (1870–1925), African-American attorney and Republican politician
 Hank Johnson (Henry C. Johnson Jr., born 1954), U.S. representative from Georgia
 Henry Augustus Johnson, justice of the peace, sheriff, and state legislator in Arkansas
 Henry S. Johnson (1900–1951), American educator and politician in the Virginia House of Delegates
 Henry Johnson (Kenosha politician), member of the Wisconsin State Assembly, founder of the State Agricultural Society

Religion
 Henry Johnson (bishop) (1834–1908), Anglican bishop
 Henry Johnson (priest) (1840–1901), Archdeacon of the Upper Niger

Sports
 Henry Johnson (footballer) (1897–1962), English footballer with Coventry City, Southampton and Queens Park Rangers
 Henry Johnson (American football) (born 1958), former American football linebacker
 Hank Johnson (baseball) (Henry Ward Johnson; 1906–1982); American baseball pitcher

Other
 Henry Johnson (pirate) (fl. 1730), Irish pirate in Spanish service, known as "Henriques the Englishman"
 Henry Johnson (railway executive) (1906–1988), chairman of British Rail
 Henry Johnson (guitarist) (born 1954), American jazz musician
 Henry Johnson (shipbuilder) (c. 1623–1683), English shipbuilder and politician
 Henry John Johnson, usually known as Harry, (1826—1884), English landscape and water colour painter

See also
 Harry Johnson (disambiguation)
 Henry Johnston (disambiguation)
 William Henry Johnson (disambiguation)
 Johnson (disambiguation)